Extended Adaptive Multi-Rate – Wideband (AMR-WB+) is an audio codec that extends AMR-WB. It adds support for stereo signals and higher sampling rates. Another main improvement is the use of transform coding (transform coded excitation – TCX) additionally to ACELP. This greatly improves the generic audio coding. Automatic switching between transform coding and ACELP provides both good speech and audio quality with moderate bit rates.

As AMR-WB operates at internal sampling rate 12.8 kHz, AMR-WB+ also supports various internal sampling frequencies ranges from 12.8 kHz to 38.4 kHz. AMR-WB uses 16 kHz sampling frequency with a resolution of 14 bits left justified in a 16-bit word. AMR-WB+ uses 16/24/32/48 kHz sampling frequencies with a resolution of 16 bits in a 16-bit word.

3GPP originally developed the AMR-WB+ audio codec for streaming and messaging services in Global System for Mobile communications (GSM) and Third Generation (3G) cellular systems.
Its primary target applications are Packet-Switched Streaming service (PSS), Multimedia Messaging Service (MMS) and Multimedia Broadcast and Multicast Service (MBMS).

File storage of AMR-WB+ encoded audio is specified within the 3GP container format, 3GPP-defined ISO-based multimedia file format defined in 3GPP TS 26.244.

The AMR-WB+ codec has a wide bit-rate range, from 5.2 to 48 kbit/s. Mono rates are scalable from 5.2 to 36 kbit/s, and stereo rates are scalable from 6.2 to 48 kbit/s, reproducing bandwidth up to 20 kHz (approaching CD quality). Moreover, it provides backward compatibility with AMR wideband.

Software support 
In September 2005, VoiceAge Corporation announced availability of AMR-WB+ decoder in Helix DNA Client.

Licensing and patent issues 
AMR-WB+ compression incorporate several patents of Nokia Corporation, Telefonaktiebolaget L. M. Ericsson and VoiceAge Corporation.

VoiceAge Corporation is the License Administrator for the AMR and AMR-WB+ patent pools. VoiceAge also accepts submission of patents for determination of their possible essentiality to these standards.

The initial fee for applications using "real-time channels" with AMR-WB+ is $6,500. Minimum annual royalty shall be $10,000, excluding the initial fee in year 1 of the license agreement.

AMR-WB+ monaural decoder in a category of personal computer products is licensed for free. Stereo AMR-WB+ decoder for personal computer products is licensed for $0.30.

See also 
 Adaptive Multi-Rate (AMR)
 Adaptive Multi-Rate Wideband (AMR-WB)
 3GP
 Comparison of audio coding formats
 RTP audio video profile

References

External links
 3GPP codecs specifications; 3G and beyond / GSM, 26 series
 3GPP TS 26.290; Audio codec processing functions; Extended Adaptive Multi-Rate – Wideband (AMR-WB+) codec; Transcoding functions
  – RTP Payload Format for the Extended Adaptive Multi-Rate Wideband (AMR-WB+) Audio Codec
  – The Codecs Parameter for "Bucket" Media Types

Audio codecs
Speech codecs